William Goodman Piper (February 16, 1906 – November 30, 1976) was a Republican member of the Pennsylvania House of Representatives.

References

Republican Party members of the Pennsylvania House of Representatives
1906 births
1976 deaths
20th-century American politicians